Petrozavodsk Airport (ex: Besovets, Petrozavodsk-2) is a joint civil-military airport in Russia located  northwest of Petrozavodsk in Besovets, Shuya Rural Settlement (municipality). It services small airliners.  It is a minor airfield with 12 parking stands and a small amount of tarmac space.

The airfield has seen military use as an interceptor base.  During the 1960s or 1970s, Sukhoi Su-15 aircraft were based at Besovets. During the 1970s it was home to the 991st Fighter Aviation Regiment (991 IAP), which flew Mikoyan-Gurevich MiG-25 'Foxbat' aircraft.  In 1992–93, the 159th Guards Fighter Aviation Regiment (159 IAP) transferred in from Poland, having left the 4th Air Army. It now flies the Sukhoi Su-35S aircraft and is now part of the 105th Guards Mixed Aviation Division, 6th Air and Air Defence Forces Army.

Airlines and destinations

Passenger

Accidents and incidents
On 20 June 2011, a RusAir Tupolev TU-134, Flight 9605, operating for RusLine, with 43 passengers and nine crew crash landed, broke up, and caught fire on a highway short of the runway 01 at Petrozavodsk Airport while en route from Moscow to Petrozavodsk, killing 47 people and leaving five survivors.

References

External links
Airport Official website 

Prionezhsky District
Russian Air Force bases
Soviet Air Force bases
Soviet Air Defence Force bases
Airports built in the Soviet Union
Airports in the Republic of Karelia